This is a list of Swedish television related events from 1962.

Events
13 February - Inger Berggren is selected to represent Sweden at the 1962 Eurovision Song Contest with her song "Sol och vår". She is selected to be the fifth Swedish Eurovision entry during Melodifestivalen 1962 held in Stockholm.

Debuts
3 October - Hylands hörna (1962-1983)

Television shows

Ending this year

Births

Deaths

See also
1962 in Sweden